Dallas Rufus Guthrie (c. 1942 – 2000) was an American football player who played for the Georgia Institute of Technology (a.k.a. Georgia Tech).  
He played collegiately for the Georgia Tech football team. He was inducted into the Georgia Tech Hall of Fame in 1971. 
Although drafted and signed as a professional he never played due to injury.  He was selected as the 10th pick in the 1963 NFL Draft by the Los Angeles Rams. 
He was also selected as the 10th pick in the first round American Football League draft of that year by the San Diego Chargers.  The Chargers won the competition for Mr. Guthrie and signed him to a professional contract.  Mr. Guthrie attended the Chargers training camp and was on the field for the team's first exhibition game. On the opening play of the game, a kick-off, Mr. Guthrie was injured.
After football, he established a successful career in real estate and died in 2000 from brain cancer.

References

1942 births
2000 deaths
American football offensive guards
Georgia Tech Yellow Jackets football players
Los Angeles Rams players